Kim Yun-Tae (born 3 July 1965) is a South Korean academic and politician. He is a member of the Minjoo Party of Korea, and is currently a professor, Department of Sociology, and Department of Social Welfare, Korea University. A sociologist, Kim is an active social welfare advocate. He has written academic and popular works regarding social issues, welfare, and politics in Korea. In 1986, Kim, as a president of student association in Korea University, contributed to university students' democratic movement and served a prison sentence of two years and six months.

He studied at University of Cambridge and later received PhD from London School of Economics and Political Science (LSE).  Following the creation of the Millennium Democratic Party, Kim served as a vice-chair of policy committee.  He later served as the 13th Speaker of the National Assembly Library of the Republic of Korea under President Kim Dae-jung. In March 2016, Kim announced his candidacy for the National Assembly in Gunsan, but was ultimately unsuccessful in the April parliamentary election.

Education 
London School of Economics and Political Science (LSE). PhD in Sociology 
University of Cambridge, Development studies, Diploma in Development Studies 
Korea University, BA in Sociology

Career 

Professor, Department of Sociology and Department of Social Welfare, Korea University
Director of Social Policy Research Center in the Public Policy Research Institute, Korea University
Vice-chair of Policy Committee, the Minjoo Party of Korea
The 13th Librarian of the National Assembly Library of the Republic of Korea
Vice-President of Korean Association of Social Welfare Policy
Advisor of Social welfare in People's Solidarity for Participatory Democracy (Non-profit organisation)
Director of Korea Society Opinion Institute National Assembly Policy Research Associate
Vice-Chair of policy committee, Millennium Democratic Party
President of Student Association, Korea University (democratisation movement activist in prison for 30 months)

Publications 

Human and societal collapse (2015) 
Korean politics: Where is it heading? (2014) (Co-author)  
Poverty: How to Fight (2013) 
Introduction to Sociology for New Generation (2012) 
A Happier Society for My Children (2012) – Co-author 
Korean Chaebol and a Developing Country (2012) 
Sociology for Everyone (2011) 
Welfare State (2010) Co-author  
A New Way of the Progress (2009), Co-author 
Eleven thoughts about Creativity (2009), Co-author 
Bureaucrats and Entrepreneurs: The State and the Chaebol in Korea (2008) 
The Social Economy and Social Enterprises: Korean Seek Social Work and Social Services (2007) Co-author 
Beyond the Free Market (2007) 
World History for the Educated Citizen (2007)  
In an Era of Soft Power (2003)  
Wind of Change (2001), 9788981201890
Chaebol and Power (2000), 9788981201616
The Third Way: Tony Blair and the Britain’s Choice, (1999), 
Globalization and the Nation State: The Case of South Korea  International Area Studies Review September 1999 2:3–21, doi:10.1177/223386599900200201
Neoliberalism and the decline of the developmental state (1999): Journal of Contemporary Asia, volume 29, Issue 4, 441–461, doi:10.1080/00472339980000231

References

Living people
Academic staff of Korea University
Korea University alumni
Alumni of the University of Cambridge
Alumni of the London School of Economics
1965 births
Place of birth missing (living people)
South Korean politicians